"Magic Power" is a single release by Hey! Say! JUMP. It was released in three different versions: a limited CD+DVD edition 1, a limited CD+DVD edition 2, and a regular CD-only edition. The single will be the theme song for the Japanese dub of the animated movie, The Smurfs,  in which members Ryosuke Yamada and Yuri Chinen provided the voices for Clumsy Smurf and Brainy Smurf respectively. This was the group's first single without Morimoto, due to the smoking scandal and suspension. It was certified platinum by the RIAJ.

Regular Edition
CD
 "Magic Power" 
 "Beat Line" 
 "Nemuri no Mori" 
 "BE ALIVE"
 "Magic Power" (Original Karaoke) 
 "Beat Line" (Original Karaoke) 
 "Nemuri no Mori" (Original Karaoke) 
 "BE ALIVE" (Original Karaoke)

Limited Edition 1
CD
 "Magic Power" 
 "School Days" - Hey! Say! BEST

DVD
 "Magic Power" (PV & Making of)

Limited Edition 2
CD
 "Magic Power"
 "GET!!" - Hey! Say! 7

DVD
30 minute footage of Hey! Say! JUMP & Yuuki 100% Concert with Yuma Nakayama Spring Concert in Nagoya.

Charts

Total Reported Sales: 254,171

References

Hey! Say! JUMP songs
2011 singles
Oricon Weekly number-one singles
Billboard Japan Hot 100 number-one singles
2011 songs
J Storm singles